A munch (derived from "burger munch") is a casual social gathering for people involved in or interested in BDSM, kink, or fetishes. No BDSM, kink, or fetish activities take place, however.

Characteristics 
Munches often take place at a restaurant, bar, coffee shop, or other public setting. A munch organizer usually reserves a large table, a back area, or a private room. People are free to arrive and leave within the specified hours. The primary purpose is socializing and meeting like-minded individuals. Munches are intended as opportunities for those who are curious about BDSM to meet others, become more comfortable, and better informed. Munches that involve alcohol are sometimes called "sloshes" or pub nights. Unlike a play party, munches are informal affairs that discourage fetish attire or BDSM play, though wearing of subtle collars or leather items may be permissible if they are nondescript. It's important to always check with the munch organizer if you have any questions about appropriate attire. Munches can be geared towards specific groups, such as LGBTIQ or BIPOC, while others may be focused on specific kinks such as Master/slave or submissive roundtables. Please note the difference between targeting a group versus discriminating against a specific group. While each munch is different and reflects the personality of the group that attends it, every munch has etiquette and rules that should be respected.

Marketing
Munch organizers may post their event information on social networking sites, or use e-mail or mailing lists. Local BDSM groups may announce a munch in-person at a meeting, on a community calendar or newsletter, or on their own websites.

History
The USENET group alt.sex.bondage was a common meeting ground online; as was a San Francisco-area email list known as BABES (Bay Area Bondage Enthusiasts Society). While organizations such as the Society of Janus and the BackDrop Club existed, there were few informal ways to meet others socially within the fetish scene. After that initial meeting, an informal rotation of organizers and locations were instituted, with widely varying amounts of success.

The Kirk's Burger Munch attracted a large and often spirited crowd, some of which participated in discreet play. As time went on, the atmosphere became more overtly fetish and BDSM play oriented, and people started bringing in outside food. Ultimately, the management insisted that the group stop meeting there. Many of the original participants organized another social gathering just down the street, though STella requested they not use the name "burger munch". The name was shortened to "munch". 

The term "Burger Munch" was also used in Boston in 1993.

See also
Fetish club
Play party (BDSM)
List of BDSM topics

References

External links 
 How to Start a BDSM Discussion Club
 What to expect at a kinky munch

BDSM terminology